Christopher Benjamin may refer to:

 Christopher Benjamin (actor) (born 1934), English actor
 Christopher Benjamin (politician), American politician from Florida
 Chris Benjamin (journalist) (born 1975), Canadian journalist, novelist and non-fiction writer
 Chris Benjamin (cricketer) (born 1999), South African cricketer